The Tanzania national under-20 football team is the under-20 youth team for national football in Tanzania. The team is controlled by the Tanzania Football Federation.

Honours
CECAFA U-20 Championship:
Winners (2): 1971, 2019
Runners-up (3): 1975, 1995, 2020

Current squad

References

External links
soccerway.com

African national under-20 association football teams
under-20